Hypobythiidae is a family of tunicates belonging to the order Phlebobranchia.

Genera:
 Hypobythius Moseley, 1877

References

Tunicates